The Online Etymology Dictionary (Etymonline) is a free online dictionary, written and compiled by Douglas R. Harper, that describes the origins of English-language words.

Description
Douglas Harper, an American Civil War historian and copy editor for LNP Media Group, compiled the etymology dictionary to record the history and evolution of more than 50,000 words, including slang and technical terms. The core body of its etymology information stems from The Barnhart Dictionary of Etymology by Robert Barnhart, Ernest Klein's Comprehensive Etymology Dictionary of the English Language, The Middle English Compendium, The Oxford English Dictionary, and the 1889–1902 Century Dictionary. Harper also researches on digital archives. On the Etymonline homepage, Harper says that he considers himself "essentially and for the most part" a compiler and evaluator of etymology research made by others.

Reviews and reputation
The Online Etymology Dictionary has been referenced by Oxford University's "Arts and Humanities Community Resource" catalog as "an excellent tool for those seeking the origins of words" and cited in the Chicago Tribune as one of the "best resources for finding just the right word". It is cited in academic work as a useful, though not definitive, reference for etymology. In addition, it has been used as a data source for quantitative scholarly research.

References

External links
 

Etymological dictionaries
English etymology
Online English dictionaries
Internet properties established in 2000